ImpreMedia, LLC is a media company headquartered on the 7th Floor of 15 MetroTech Center in Downtown Brooklyn, New York City.

ImpreMedia's products include Hispanic newspapers, websites, and magazines. In its portfolio it has some of the most reputed news publications in Spanish based in the United States such as La Opinión and El Diario La Prensa.

History
It was co-founded by John Paton.

In 2012 it was taken over by US Hispanic Media Inc, a subsidiary of Argentinian company S.A. La Nación.

In December 2018,  Iván Adaime was appointed C.E.O. 

In May 2022, My Code Media Acquired a majority ownership in ImpreMedia

Digital Media
La Opinión 
El Diario
La Raza
Solo Dinero 
Siempre Auto
Comedera
Estar Mejor
Guía de Compras

Print
La Opinión in Los Angeles
El Diario La Prensa in New York
La Raza in Chicago
La Prensa in Orlando
La Opinión de la Bahía in San Francisco

References

External links

 ImpreMedia

Companies based in New York City